State Route 48 (SR 48) is the unsigned designation for the Blue Ridge Parkway and Skyline Drive from the North Carolina state line north to U.S. Route 340 (US 340) near Front Royal. Most of the road is maintained by the National Park Service, though the portion which is concurrent with SR 43 is maintained by the Virginia Department of Transportation (VDOT).

Other Route 48s

The following highways in Virginia have also been known as State Route 48:
 State Route 48, 1928 to the mid-1930s, now part of SR 40.
 U.S. Route 48, early 2000s to the present, concurrent with the westernmost  of SR 55.

Major intersections

References

External links

048
State Route 048
State Route 048
State Route 048
State Route 048
State Route 048
State Route 048
State Route 048
State Route 048
State Route 048
State Route 048
State Route 048
State Route 048
State Route 048
State Route 048
State Route 048
State Route 048
State Route 048
State Route 048
State Route 048
State Route 048